St Winefride's Church (also known as St Winifred's Church or St Winefred's Church) is a Roman Catholic Parish church in Holywell, Flintshire. It was founded by the Society of Jesus and was first church in the United Kingdom to be administered by the Vocationist Fathers. It is Grade II listed building. It was the first church the Jesuits built in Wales.

History
It was founded by the Jesuits in 1832. They went on to establish St Beuno's College in 1848. From the college they also founded other churches such as Our Lady of the Assumption Church in Rhyl and Our Lady of Ransom and the Holy Souls Church in Llandrindod Wells.

At some point in the twentieth-century they handed over the church to the Diocese of Wrexham. On 19 August 1991, the church was designated a Grade II listed building.

On 6 April 2008, the Bishop of Wrexham, Edwin Regan, invited the Vocationist Fathers to the church and who continue to administer the parish.

Shrines

Holywell

Within the parish is one of the Seven Wonders of Wales, St Winefride's Well, a shrine and site of pilgrimage. The shrine and relics are in the care of the church.

Pantasaph

Close to the parish, near Holywell, is the National Shrine of St Pio and St David's Church in the village of Pantasaph. It was founded in 1852, by the Order of Friars Minor Capuchin.

Parish

The Vocationist Fathers also serve the Sacred Heart church in Hawarden. The church was founded by the Diocese of Wrexham and was built in the late twentieth century. It has one Sunday Mass at 10:30am.

St Winefride's has three Sunday Masses, one at 6:00pm on Saturday evening in the church, and at 9:30am and 5pm on Sunday in the chapel of St Winefride's Well. There are weekday Masses at 9:30am on Monday, Wednesday and Friday and at 7:00pm on Tuesday and Thursday.

Stained glass

References

External links
 
 St Winefride's Church Main Website
 Vocationist Fathers UK site
 St Winefride's Well site
 Pantasaph Franciscan Friary site 
Artwork at St Winefride's Church, Holywell

Grade II listed churches in Flintshire
Grade II listed Roman Catholic churches in Wales
Roman Catholic churches completed in 1912
1832 establishments in Wales
Neoclassical architecture in Wales
20th-century Roman Catholic church buildings in the United Kingdom
Vocationist churches in the United Kingdom
Neoclassical church buildings in the United Kingdom